Kuchh Jhuki Palkain is an Indian television drama-series that aired on Sony TV, also known as Sony TV. The series premiered on 29 April 2002 and aired on weekdays at 14:00 IST.

Plot
Niyati (Ritu Chaudhary) is a simple Indian girl who marries Vansh (Pracheen Chauhan), who is returning from the US. Vansh had a girlfriend in the USA but married Niyati only due to family pressure. Slowly Vansh starts to fall for Niyati but things become complicated when his ex-girlfriend is revealed to be Archita — Niyati's elder rebellious sister. Things take a turn for worse when Vansh's parents are revealed to be his grandparents and he is revealed to be the illicit son of his sister Manta from a love affair. The show follows Niyati and Vansh as they try to save their relationship and deal with problems that surround them.

Cast
 Ritu Chaudhary as  Niyati Vansh  Khanna
 Pracheen Chauhan as Vansh Khanna
 Sandeep Baswana
 Nayan Bhatt as Mrs. Khanna
 Gayatri Rana
 Sheetal Shah as Archita
 Iqbal Azad
 Subbiraj

References

External links
Kuchh Jhuki Palkain 'Launch' article on Indian Television Dot Com
Kuchh Jhuki Palkain official site

Balaji Telefilms television series
Indian television soap operas
Indian television series
Sony Entertainment Television original programming
2002 Indian television series debuts
2003 Indian television series endings